The Ranger Oil Boom started on October 17, 1917, after oil was discovered at the J.H. McCleskey No. 1 drill well when oil roared up from  below ground in Ranger, Texas. The strike was notable because the threatened exit of Soviet Russia  from World War I meant a lot of oil output was lost to the Allies. Before WWI Russia accounted for 30% of the world's oil production, more than any other country.   On December 15, 1917, an armistice between Soviet Russia and the Central Powers was concluded. According to a story from USA Today, the oil from the Ranger Oil Strike helped win World War I.

Discovery
William Knox Gordon made his fortune with the Texas and Pacific Coal Company in Thurber, Texas, no relation to the Texas and Pacific Railway although they did business. He saw the writing on the wall and wanted to diversify into the oil and petroleum industry.  

William Gordon and his Texas Pacific Coal Company of Thurber, Texas, drilled a gas well north of Ranger in August 1917, after town civic leaders offered acreage in return for four test wells. Then on October 17, 1917, the J.H. McCleskey No. 1, a mile southwest of Ranger, produced oil at 1200 BOPD. The Ranger Oil Field production peaked in July 1919 at 80,000 BOPD. The oil boom brought many seeking jobs, including farm boys and demobilized veterans.

Aftermath

The oil from the reservoir was soon drained and the region's oil boom went bust the J.H. McCleskey No. 1 oil well was abandoned on May 30, 1930.

Bibliography 
Notes

References 

  - Total pages: 320 
 

 
 [

Cities in Eastland County, Texas